Girish Puthenchery (1961–2010) was a noted malayalam Lyricist, Poet, Scriptwriter and Screenwriter. He was always referred to as the aristocratic lyricist of malayalam who had a distinctive writing style of his own. He also served as the director of Indian Performance Rights Society Malayalam division (I.P.R.S) and governing council member of the Kerala Kalamandalam and Kerala Lalithakala Academy. He debuted with the movie Enquiry in 1989. He won the Kerala State Film Award for Best Lyricist seven times. He also holds the record for writing the highest number of songs in the malayalam film industry within the briefest period of time. He died on 10 february 2010 in a private hospital in kozhikode.

Life and career

Personal life 
Girish was born to Pulikkool Krishna Panicker and Meenakshi Amma in Puthenchery near Ulliyeri village in Kozhikode district of Kerala. His father was an astrologer and Ayurvedic practitioner, while his mother was a Carnatic musician.Girish learned the basic lessons of music from his mother and knowledge of Sanskrit from his father. he completed his primary education at GLP School Puthenchery, AUP School Modakkallur, and Palora HSS Ulliyeri after that he pursued a degree in literature at Govt arts and science college, Meenchantha. 

From a very young age, Girish was drawn towards the language and literature of malayalam, at the age of 14 his first poem named Mochanam (ml:മോചനം) is published in a weekly magazine .During his childhood days he is an active member of Balasangam (an Indian children's organization wing of the CPIM ) and later he became a noted artist of Chenthara Arts Club (a cultural club located in Puthenchery) by writing and directing many dramas and songs along with his brother Mohanan puthenchery and natives.

He is married to Beena and they have two children, Jitin Puthenchery and Din nath Puthenchery. His elder son Jithin started off as an assistant director, working on films Breaking News, Money Rathnam, Rock On 2 and Tharangam. Jithin managed to land his first major acting gig after writer director Shankar Ramakrishnan organised an acting camp to select actors for Pathinettam Padi. Jithin also played major roles in the films include Edakkad Bttalion , Pranaya Meenukalude Kadal. His younger son Din Nath started his career as a lyricist and copywriter who has penned many songs for Malayalam films including Meow Meow Karimpoocha, Matinee , Aasha Black, Money Ratnam , Gunday,Chennai Koottam, Seconds, Moonu Wickettinu 365 Runs, Olappeeppi, Mangalyam Thanthunanena, and is currently working as an assistant director in Malayalam film industry, most recently on the movie Trance.

Prior to joining the malayalam film industry, He worked as a collection agent in Kozhikode RTO office and copywriter at All India Radio, Kozhikode. At the same time, he continued to write songs and Lalitha Ganams for popular cassette Recording Companies include Akashvani, HMV, Magnasounds and Tharangini and he also penned many hit songs for Dooradarshan and Asianet.

Film Career 
In 1989 malayalam movie Director Vijayan Karote introduced Girish to the malayalam film industry. Girish penned lyrics and screenplay for Vijayan karot's movie named Bhramarakashassu,but due to some reasons the initial release of the film was delayed, at the same year Girish got an opportunity to write songs for another movie named Enquiry which was directed by U.V Raveendranath and with Rajamani as the music composer through this film Girish's first song "Janmantharangalil" released and it was his debut movie, But the songs didn't gain much popularity. After that director Ranjith scripted for the movie George kutty c\o George kutty  turned Girish to the lyrics writing. Ranjith's recommendation brought him the chance to write songs for director Jayaraj's movie Johny walker which was his breakthrough film, whose track Shanthamee Rathriyil has become iconic and had brought him critical acclamation, which reflects his career in Malayalam film industry. He was also one of the most honoured lyricists having won the Kerala State Award for best lyricist seven times.

Other Works 
Besides writing lyrics, Girish had also written the screenplay for the films Brahmarakshassu, Pallavur Devanarayanan, Vadakkumnadhan, and Kinnaripuzhayoram, and the story for Meleparambil Aanveedu, Adivaram, Ikkareyanente Manasam, Oro Viliyum Kathorthu and Kerala House Udan Vilpanakku. Girish has also published two poetry collection which contains morethan 100 poems. He also composed music for a devotional album. He was also scripting a film by the name of Raman Police, in which Mohanlal was expected to play the lead role.

Filmography
Most Popular Songs
Pinneyum Pinnenyum (പിന്നെയും പിന്നെയും ആരോ) 
Doore Maamara Kombil (ദൂരേ മാമര കൊമ്പിൽ)
Manikyakkallaal (മാണിക്യ കല്ലാൽ)
Velli Nilaa (വെള്ളിനിലാ തുള്ളികളോ)
Thamarappoovil Vazhum (താമരപ്പൂവില്‍ വാഴും ദേവിയല്ലോ നീ)
Ammoommakkili Vayadi (അമ്മൂമ്മക്കിളി വായാടി)
Onnam Vattam Kandappol (ഒന്നാം വട്ടം കണ്ടപ്പോള്‍)
Harimuraleeravam (ഹരിമുരളീരവം)
Padi Thodiyiletho (പാടി തൊടിയിലേതോ)
Malayannarkkannan (മലയണ്ണാര്‍ കണ്ണന്‍)
Choolamadichu Karangi (ചൂളമടിച്ചു കറങ്ങി നടക്കും)
Ethrayo Janmamay (എത്രയോ ജന്മമായ്)
Oru Rathri Koodi (ഒരു രാത്രി കൂടി വിടവാങ്ങവേ)
Aarodum Mindathe (ആരോടും മിണ്ടാതെ)
Machakathammaye (മച്ചകത്തമ്മയെ കാല്‍തൊട്ടു വന്ദിച്ചു)
Oru poovine (ഒരു പൂവിനെ നിശാശലഭം)
Doore oru Tharam (ദൂരെ ഒരു താരം)
Moovanthithazhvarayil (മൂവന്തി താഴ്വരയിൽ)
Manjakkiliyude (മഞ്ഞക്കിളിയുടെ മൂളി പാട്ടുണ്ടെ)
Ponnaaryan Padam (പൊന്നാര്യന്‍ പാടം)
Melleyen kannile (മെല്ലെയെന്‍ കണ്ണിലെ)
Karunaamayane (കരുണാമയനെ കാവല്‍ വിളക്കെ)
Sundariye Sundariye (സുന്ദരിയെ സുന്ദരിയെ)
Thechippove Thenkashi (തെച്ചി പൂവേ തെങ്കാശിപൂവേ)
Othiri Othiri (ഒത്തിരി ഒത്തിരി സ്വപ്‌നങ്ങള്‍)
Aaro Viral Neetti (ആരോ വിരല്‍ നീട്ടി)
Vennilaakkombile (വെണ്ണിലാ കൊമ്പിലെ രാപ്പാടി)
Nadodipoothinkal (നാടോടി പൂന്തിങ്കള്‍ മുടിയില്‍ ചൂടി) 
Njan oru pattu padaam (ഞാനൊരു പാട്ടു പാടാം)
Thumbayum thulasiyum (തുമ്പയും തുളസിയും കുടമുല്ല പൂവും)
Shanthamee Rathriyi (ശാന്തമീ രാത്രിയില്‍)
Rathrilillikal Poothapol (രാത്രിലില്ലികള്‍ പൂത്തപോല്‍)
Kaikkudanna Niraye (കയ്ക്കുടന്ന നിറയെ)
Ooru sanam odi vannu (ഊരു സനം ഓടി വന്നു)
Soorya kireedam (സൂര്യ കിരീടം വീണുടഞ്ഞു)
Medapponnaniyum (മേട പൊന്നണിയും)
Olachangaali (ഓലച്ചങ്ങാതി)
Karutha penne Ninne (കറുത്ത പെണ്ണെ നിന്നെ)
Kallipoonkuyile (കള്ളി പൂങ്കുയിലേ)
Poonilaamazha (പൂനിലാമഴ പെയ്തിറങ്ങിയ)
Chinkaram kinnaram (ചിങ്കാര കിന്നാരം)
Nilave Mayumo (നിലാവേ മായുമോ)
Aattuthottilil Ninne (ആട്ടു തൊട്ടിലിൽ നിന്നെ) 
Thaimaavin Thanalil (തയ്മാവിന്‍ തണലില്‍)
Thechippove Thenkashi (തെചിപ്പൂവേ തെങ്കാശി പൂവേ)
Nilavinte neelabhasma (നിലാവിന്‍റെ നീലഭസ്മ )
Maaleyam Marodaninjum (മാലേയം മാറോടണിഞ്ഞു)
Sooryanalam (സൂര്യനാളം പൊന്‍ വിളക്കായ്)
Mele Mele Maanam (മേലെ മേലെ മാനം)
Ponnambili pottum Thottu (പൊന്നമ്പിളി പൊട്ടും തൊട്ടു)
Manjil Pootha sandhye (മഞ്ഞില്‍ പൂത്ത സന്ധ്യേ)
Raathinkal Poothaali (രാത്തിങ്കള്‍ പൂത്താലി ചാര്‍ത്തി)
Vaidooryakkammalaninju (വൈഡൂര്യക്കമ്മലണിഞ്ഞു)
Devakanyaka (ദേവകന്യക സൂര്യതംബുരു)
Paathirappullunarnnu (പാതിരാ പുള്ളുണര്‍ന്നു)
Manjakkanikkonna (മഞ്ഞകണികൊന്ന കൊമ്പിലെ)
Maarikkoodinnullil (മരിക്കൂടിന്നുള്ളില്‍ പാടും)
Chemboove Poove (ചെമ്പൂവേ പൂവേ)
Aattirambile Kombile (ആറ്റിരമ്പിലെ കൊമ്പിലെ)
Thankathinkal Kiliyay (തങ്കതിങ്കള്‍ കിളിയായ് കുറുകാം)
Neeyurangiyo nilave (നീയുറങ്ങിയോ നിലാവേ)
Kithachethum kaatte (കിതച്ചെത്തും കാറ്റേ)
Urukiyuruki (ഉരുകിയുരുകി എരിയുമീ)
Vilakku vaykkum (വിളക്കു വെയ്ക്കും വിണ്ണില്‍)
Manjukaalam nolkkum( മഞ്ഞുകാലം നോല്‍ക്കും)
Veyilinte Oru Thooval (വെയിലിന്‍റെ ഒരു തൂവല്‍)
Pular veyilum Pakal(പുലര്‍ വെയിലും പകല്‍ മുകിലും)
Ponnaanappuramerana (പൊന്നാന പുറമേറണ)
Kokki Kurukiyum (കൊക്കി കുറുകിയും)
Nilaappaithale (നിലാപൈതലേ)
Ey Chumma Chumma (ചുമ്മാ ചുമ്മാ കരയാതെടോ)
Mele vinnin muttatharee (മേലെ വിണ്ണിന്‍ മുറ്റത്താരി)
Thekku Thekku (തെക്ക് തെക്ക് തെക്കേ പാടം)
Thekkan Katte (തെക്കന്‍ കാറ്റേ)
Yaathrayayi Sooryankuram (യാത്രയായ് സൂര്യങ്കുരം)
Oru chik chik chirakil (ഒരു ചിക്ക് ചിക്ക് ചിറകില്‍)
Kanakamjunthirikal (കനകമുന്തിരികള്‍)
Onnu Thottene Ninne(ഒന്നു തോട്ടെനെ) 
Manimuttathaavani (മണിമുറ്റത്താവണി പന്തല്‍)
Vaarthinkal Thellalle (വാര്‍ത്തിങ്കല്‍ തെല്ലല്ലേ)
Kannil Kaashithumba (കണ്ണില്‍ കാശി തുമ്പകള്‍)
Pazhanimala murukanu (ധാംങ്കണക്ക ജില്ലം ജില്ലം)
Niranazhi Ponnin (നിറനാഴി പൊന്നിന്‍)
Shivamalli Poo Pozhiikum (ശിവമല്ലി പൂപൊഴിക്കും)
Manassin Manichimizhil(മനസ്സിന്‍ മണിച്ചിമിഴില്‍)
Kunuku Penmaniye (കുണുക്കു പെണ്മണിയെ നുണുക്കു വിദ്യകളാല്‍)
Aakasha deepangal Sakshi (ആകാശ ദീപങ്ങള്‍ സാക്ഷി)
Pottukuthedi (പൊട്ടു കുത്തെടി)
Thakilu Pukilu (തകിലു പുകിലു)
Ariyathe Ariyathe  (അറിയാതെ അറിയാതെ )
Vadikadara Vedi Padahamode (വടികടാര വെടി പടഹം)
Kudamulla Kammalaninjal (കുടമുല്ല കമ്മലണിഞ്ഞാല്‍)
Marannittumenthino (മറന്നിട്ടുമെന്തിനോ മനസ്സില്‍)
Amma nakshathrame (അമ്മ നക്ഷത്രമേ)
Oru pattin (ഒരു പാട്ടിന്‍ കാറ്റില്‍)
Chandanamani Sandhyakalude (ചന്ദനമണി സന്ധ്യകളുടെ)
Pathinalam Ravinte Pira Pole (പതിനാലാം രാവിന്‍റെ പിറപോലെ)
Chandana Thennalai (ചന്ദന തെന്നലായ്)
Govinda govinda (ആലാരെ ഗോവിന്ദാ)
Megharagham Nerukil(മേഘരാഗം നെറുകില്‍ തൊട്ടു)
Padam Vanamali (പാടാം വനമാലി)
Viral Thottal Viriyunna (വിരല്‍ തൊട്ടാല്‍ വിരിയുന്ന)
Sunu Muth wale (സുനു മിത്ത് വാലെ)
Mazhayulla Rathriyil (മഴയുള്ള രാത്രിയില്‍)
Piranna Mannil Ninnu (പിറന്ന മണ്ണില്‍ നിന്നുയര്‍ന്നു)
Kadukedu Mulakedu (കടുകെടു മുളകെടു)
Kannivasantham (കന്നിവസന്തം കാറ്റില്‍ മൂളും)
Oru mazhapakshi padunnu (ഒരു മഴ പക്ഷി പാടുന്നു)
Karimukil Varnante Chundil (കാര്‍മുകില്‍ വര്‍ണന്‍റെ ചുണ്ടില്‍)
Manassil Midhuna Mazha (മനസ്സില്‍ മിഥുനമഴ)
Gopike hridayam (ഗോപികേ ഹൃദയമൊരു)
Aarum Kanathe (ആരും കാണാതെ)
Karimizhikkuruviye (കരിമിഴി കുരുവിയെ)
Ente ellam ellam alle (എന്‍റെ എല്ലാമെല്ലാം)
Chingamasam Vanu chernnal (ചിങ്ങമാസം വന്നു ചേര്‍ന്നാല്‍)
Penne penne nin (പെണ്ണെ പെണ്ണെ നിന്‍)
Marakudayaal Mukham (മറക്കുടയാല്‍ മുഖം)
Melleyonnu padi ninne (മെല്ലെയൊന്നു പാടി നിന്നെ)
Chilamboli katte (ചിലമ്പോലി കാറ്റേ)
Aaroraal (ആരോരാള്‍ പുലര്‍മഴയില്‍)
Aalila ravile Thennale (ആലില കാവിലെ തെന്നലേ)
Dingiri Dingiri Pattalam (ഡിങ്കിരി പട്ടാളം)
Pamba Ganapathi (പമ്പാ ഗണപതി)
Enthe Innum Vanneela (എന്തേ ഇന്നും വന്നീല)
Paikarumbiye Meykum (പൈകറുംമ്പിയെ മേയ്ക്കും)
Ninakente Manassile (നിനക്കെന്‍റെ മനസ്സിലെ)
Thamaranoolinal (താമര നൂലിനാൽ)
Vavavo Vave (വാവാവോ വാവേ)
Kaananakkuyilinu (കാനന കുയിലിനു) 
Kannil Kannil Minnum (കണ്ണിൽ കണ്ണിൽ മിന്നും കണ്ണാടിയിൽ) 
Urangathe Ravurangi (ഉറങ്ങാതെ രാവുറങ്ങി)
Innale Ente Nenjile (ഇന്നലെ എന്റെ നെഞ്ചിലെ)
Chilu Chilum (ചിലു ചിലും)
Kaa Kaakke (കാ കാറ്റേ)
Mattupoetti koyilile (മാട്ടുപ്പെട്ടി കോയിലിലെ)
Kakkothi kavile (കാക്കോത്തി കാവിലെ)
kandu kandu kothi (കണ്ടു കണ്ടു കൊതി കൊണ്ടു നിന്നു കുയിലെ)
Kannu nattu kathirinnittum (കണ്ണു നട്ടു കാത്തിരിന്നിട്ടും)
Akale Akale Aaro (അകലെ അകലെ ആരോ)
Thotturummi Irikkan (തൊട്ടുരുമ്മി ഇരിക്കാന്‍)
Hara Hara Shankara (ഹര ഹര ശങ്കരാ)
Pulariyiloru Poontheennal (പുലരിയിലൊരു പൂന്തെന്നല്‍)
May masam manassinullil (മെയ്മാസം മനസ്സിനുള്ളില്‍)
Kuttuval Kurumbi (കുട്ടുവാല്‍ കുറുമ്പി )
Kuyil pattil Oonjal (കുയില്‍ പാട്ടില്‍)
Thanichirikumbom (തനിച്ചിരിക്കുമ്പോള്‍)
Enthu paranjalum nee (എന്ത് പറഞ്ഞാലും നീ)
Shwasathin thalam (ശ്വാസത്തിന്‍ താളം)
Munthiri padam poothu (മുന്തിരി പാടം)
Muttathethum Thennale (മുറ്റത്തെത്തും തെന്നലേ)
Aararum Kanathe Aaromal (ആരാരും കാണാതെ ആരോമല്‍ തൈമുല്ല)
Oru chiri kandal (ഒരു ചിരികണ്ടാല്‍) 
Ammayenna Vakku kondu (അമ്മയെന്ന വാക്കുകൊണ്ട്)
Thira Nirayum churul (തിര നുരയും ചുരുള്‍ മുടിയില്‍)
Pinakkamano Ennodinakkamano (പിണക്കമാണോ എന്നോടിണക്കമാണോ)
Shivamalli kavil koovalam (ശിവമല്ലി കാവിൽ കൂവളം)
Pottu thottu ponnumani (പൊട്ടു തൊട്ട പൊന്നുമണി)
Kannil ummavechu padan (കണ്ണിൽ ഉമ്മ)
sayam Sandhyayil (സായം സന്ധ്യയിൽ)
Etho Rathrimazha (ഏതോ രാത്രിമഴ)
Mallikapoo Pottuthottu (മല്ലിക പൂ പൊട്ടു തൊട്ട്)
Kusumavadhana (കുസുമവധന)
Poo Kumkumapoo (പൂ കുങ്കുമപ്പൂ)
Aatinkarayorathe (ആറ്റിൻ കരയോരത്തെ)
Gange thudiyil (ഗംഗേ തുടിയിൽ ഉണരും))
kalabham thram (കളഭം തരാം ഭഗവാനെൻ)
Oru kili pattu (ഒരു കിളി പാട്ടു മൂളവേ)
Mukile Mukile (മുകിലേ മുകിലേ നീ)
Natha nee varumbol (നാഥാ നീ വരുമ്പോൾ)
Arappavan Ponnukond (അരപ്പവൻ പൊന്നുകൊണ്ടു)
Pattum Padiyoru (പാട്ടും പാടിയൊരു)
Dhum Dhum Dhum (ധും ധും ദൂരെയേതോ)
Raaverayay poove(രാവേറെയായ് പൂവേ)
Amma mazhakarinu (അമ്മ മഴക്കറിനു)
Jwalamukhi kathunnoru (ജ്വാലാമുഖി കത്തുന്നൊരു)
oru yathra mozhiyode (ഒരു യാത്ര മൊഴിയോടെ)
Chanthu Thottile (ചാന്തു തൊട്ടില്ലേ നീ ചന്ദനം)
koovaram kili paithale (കൂവരം കിളി പൈതലെ)
Eniku padan oru (എനിക്ക് പാടാൻ ഒരു പാട്ടിൽ ഉണ്ടൊരു പെണ്ണ്)
Mamarangale oru manju (മാമരങ്ങളേ)
Aaro nilavay thalodi (ആരോ നിലാവായ്‌ തലോടി)
Vennilavu kannuvecha (വെണ്ണിലാവു കണ്ണുവെച്ച വെണ്ണകുടമേ)
Junile Nilamazhayil (ജൂണിലെ നിലാ മഴയിൽ)
Aakashamariyathe (ആകാശമാറിയാതെ സൂര്യനുണരുന്നു)
Pinne ennodonnum parayathe (പിന്നെ എന്നോടൊന്നും പറയാതെ)
Manju Kalam Dhoore Manju (മഞ്ഞു കാലം ദൂരെ മാഞ്ഞു)

Death 
Girish was a chronic diabetic and hypertensive patient. He was admitted to MIMS hospital near his home on 6 February 2010 after he suffered a massive stroke. He was writing a eulogy on the popular actor and director Cochin Haneefa, who had died four days earlier, when he suffered a stroke. He slipped into a coma soon after reaching hospital. He was twice operated upon, but his condition did not improve and he suffered a brain hemorrhage. Finally he died at the hospital at 8:30 PM on 10 February 2010, aged 48. He was cremated with full state honors at the Mavoor Road crematorium on the next day.

Awards

References

External links
 

Malayalam-language writers
Malayalam-language lyricists
Writers from Kozhikode
Kerala State Film Award winners
1961 births
2010 deaths
Filmfare Awards South winners
Screenwriters from Kerala
20th-century Indian poets
Poets from Kerala
21st-century Indian poets
Malayalam screenwriters